Alejandro "Álex" Berenguer Remiro (born 4 July 1995) is a Spanish professional footballer who plays as a winger for Athletic Bilbao. He began his career at Osasuna in 2014, and played in Italy with Torino for three seasons before joining Athletic in 2020.

Club career

Osasuna
Berenguer was born in Pamplona, Navarre; his father's family is from Almería. He graduated with CA Osasuna's youth setup, and made his debuts as a senior with the reserves in the 2013–14 campaign, in Tercera División.

On 10 September 2014, Berenguer made his professional debut, replacing Kenan Kodro in the 81st minute of a 2–0 away loss against Deportivo Alavés, for the season's Copa del Rey. He made his Segunda División debut on 10 January of the following year, again from the bench in a 1–1 away draw against Recreativo de Huelva.

Berenguer scored his first professional goal on 30 August 2015, netting the game's only in a home success over CD Mirandés. The following 29 January he extended his contract until 2020, and finished the campaign with three goals in 39 appearances as his side achieved promotion to La Liga.

Berenguer made his debut in the highest category of Spanish football on 22 September 2016, starting in a 2–1 home loss against RCD Espanyol. He scored in the top division for the first time on 5 April of the following year, netting the game's only goal in an away success over Deportivo Alavés.

Torino
On 17 July 2017, Berenguer was sold to Italian club Torino for €5.5 million (plus €1 million in bonuses). In addition, a clause was inserted for an additional €1.5 million in the event he was sold to Athletic Bilbao (a club he had been close to signing for but which has a rivalry with Osasuna, made worse in the weeks beforehand over accusations of Athletic 'poaching' a youth player).

Athletic Bilbao
On 2 October 2020, Athletic Bilbao reached an agreement with Torino for the transfer of Berenguer, who agreed to a four-year deal with the Lions. In January 2021 he claimed a winner's medal with his new club in the 2020–21 Supercopa de España played in Seville. Two months later, he scored a winning goal in extra time against Levante UD to send Athletic to the 2021 Copa del Rey Final. He started the final, but was substituted in the second half and the match, again in Seville's Estadio de La Cartuja, was lost 4–0 to FC Barcelona. A similar scenario at the same venue had unfolded two weeks earlier in the delayed 2020 Copa del Rey Final, a 1–0 defeat by Real Sociedad.

Berenguer also scored eight league goals in his first season at San Mamés, but he did not find the net again for several months of the following campaign and came under threat from teenager Nico Williams in the battle for a regular starting place on the wing. In February 2022 he broke his duck for the season with a "stunning" late winner against Real Madrid at the 2021–22 Copa del Rey's quarter-final stage, having come on for the injured Williams at half-time.

Career statistics

Honours
Athletic Bilbao
Supercopa de España: 2020–21
Copa del Rey runner-up: 2019–20, 2020–21

References

External links
 
 
 
 
 
 
 

1995 births
Living people
Footballers from Pamplona
Spanish footballers
Association football wingers
La Liga players
Segunda División players
Tercera División players
CA Osasuna B players
CA Osasuna players
Athletic Bilbao footballers
Serie A players
Torino F.C. players
Spanish expatriate footballers
Spanish expatriate sportspeople in Italy
Expatriate footballers in Italy
People of Andalusian descent